Corey Dargel (born October 19, 1977, in McAllen, Texas) is a composer, lyricist, and singer of electronic art songs that "smartly and impishly blur the boundaries between contemporary classical idioms and pop" .

Career
Formally trained in music composition, Dargel studied with Pauline Oliveros, John Luther Adams, and Brenda Hutchinson, and received a B.M. from Oberlin.

According to Dargel, "The singer-songwriter approach to art song composition is a natural and refreshing alternative to the hegemony of traditional art song and operatic performance." Dargel typically writes both words and music for all of his songs and, in his earlier compositions, he accompanies his own voice with a prepared electronic soundtrack. His debut album, Less Famous Than You, released in May 2006 on Use Your Teeth records, is clearly within the singer-songwriter tradition despite its incorporation of totalist rhythmic relationships. But his follow-up, Other People's Love Songs, released in 2008 on the contemporary classical label New Amsterdam Records, further blurs the lines between indie pop and the conceptual and post-minimalist conceits of downtown contemporary classical music.

In May 2010, New Amsterdam released a follow-up, a 2-CD set entitled Someone Will Take Care of Me, which combines two song-cycles performed by Dargel with live musicians most usually associated with contemporary classical music performance: On Removable Parts, he is joined by pianist Kathleen Supové, and on Thirteen Near-Death Experiences he is joined by members of the International Contemporary Ensemble (ICE) and composer/drummer David T. Little. The instrumentation for these two cycles clearly references the classical song cycle tradition; the former voice and piano combination is the original instrumentation for 19th century romantic song cycles (e.g. Franz Schubert's Die schöne Müllerin, Robert Schumann's Dichterliebe, etc.), while the latter's small ensemble of flute, clarinet, violin, cello, and piano was introduced by Arnold Schoenberg for his 1912 song cycle Pierrot Lunaire and, with or without the addition of a percussionist, has become a ubiquitous ensemble for the performance of 20th and 21st century classical music and has been also used in countless vocal works including Peter Maxwell Davies's Eight Songs for a Mad King.

Dargel has also performed and recorded music by other composers, including Oliveros, Eve Beglarian, k. terumi shorb, Phil Kline, and Nick Brooke.

Discography

Studio albums
 Less Famous Than You (Use Your Teeth, 2006)
 Other People's Love Songs (New Amsterdam Records, 2008)
 Someone Will Take Care of Me (New Amsterdam Records, 2010), with the International Contemporary Ensemble, Kathleen Supové and David T. Little
 Last Words from Texas EP (Automatic Heartbreak, 2011)
 OK It's Not OK (New Amsterdam Records, 2015)

Compilations
 Unreleased Songs (2001–2011) (Automatic Heartbreak, 2011)

References

External links
 Corey Dargel's official website
 Interview with Culturebot

1977 births
21st-century American composers
21st-century American male musicians
21st-century classical composers
21st-century American LGBT people
American classical composers
American male classical composers
Classical musicians from Texas
LGBT classical composers
LGBT classical musicians
American LGBT musicians
Living people
Oberlin College alumni
Pupils of Pauline Oliveros